Stephen Found is a major supporter and strategic investor of the Australian arts industry. He is the owner of Foundation Theatres Pty Limited (formerly Foundation Entertainment Group Limited), a wholly Australian family owned and operated organisation. Foundation Theatres own and operate two of Sydney’s premiere commercial theatres; the Sydney Lyric and Capitol Theatre, Sydney.

Career
Stephen was a natural entrepreneur long before that word was widely used. He enjoyed business success as a young man in the technical services industry which provided him with broad management skill and enormous confidence. That business served Stephen and his family well when it was sold in 2006. Whilst he enjoys a tech challenge, his first love (after his wife and family), is the theatre.

Stephen’s started his working life as an apprentice at Strand Electrics, a supplier of theatrical lighting to theatres, producers and concert promoters. In 1984, he founded Bytecraft Entertainment (now a Tatts Group ASX listed subsidiary company) and built the company over 20 years, building theatre infrastructure around the world with innovative lighting and automation systems. After the sale of Bytcraft Entertainment to the world’s largest theatrical lighting and sound provider, Stephen commenced his investment in the ownership, restoration and operations of theatres and theatre businesses under his new company, Foundation Theatres.

In May 2009, Capitol Theatre Management Pty Limited became a wholly owned subsidiary of Foundation Entertainment Group Limited, oh which Stephen is Managing Director. Sydney Lyric Theatre Pty Limited has been owned and operated by the Foundation Entertainment Group Limited since October 2011.

In February 2017, the Sydney Lyric underwent a $12 million auditorium upgrade. These works completed the upgrade of the whole theatre, encompassing foyers, bars & box office which were completed in 2014. The total expenditure on these upgrades is in excess of $18 million.

Throughout his business journey his wife Angela has been an unwavering support and consultative voice of reason, and a vital part of a family businesses success.

Stephen's objective is to continue to develop the theatre business around Australia by strategic acquisition, or by building new theatres, and creating venues that are at the cutting edge of design and operations international.

Education
Qualified from RMIT Melbourne as a service engineer in the 1970s.

References

Living people
Australian theatre owners
Year of birth missing (living people)